Na Wang is a district (amphoe) in the western part of Nong Bua Lamphu province, northeastern Thailand.

Geography
Neighboring districts are (from the east clockwise): Na Klang and Si Bun Rueang of Nong Bua Lamphu Province and Erawan and Na Duang of Loei province.

History
The district was established on 30 April 1994, when five tambons were split off from Na Klang district. It was upgraded to a full district on 11 October 1997.

Administration
The district is divided into five sub-districts (tambons), which are further subdivided into 51 villages (mubans). Na Lao is a township (thesaban tambon) which covers parts of tambons Na Lao and Thep Khiri. There are a further five  tambon administrative organizations (TAO).

References

External links
www.baandawan.com
www.dawantours.com

Na Wang